The Burya ("Storm" in Russian) was a supersonic, intercontinental cruise missile, developed by the Lavochkin design bureau (chief designer Naum Semyonovich Chernyakov) under designation La-350 from 1954 until the program cancellation in February 1960. The request for proposal issued by the Soviet government in 1954, called for a cruise missile capable of delivering a nuclear payload to the United States. Analogous developments in the United States were the SM-62 Snark and SM-64 Navaho cruise missiles, particularly the latter, which used parallel technology and had similar performance goals.

Development

The first steps towards development of Burya was the idea of Mstislav Vsevolodovich Keldysh of Keldysh bomber. The Burya was planned as a Mach 3 intercontinental nuclear ramjet cruise missile. The Burya was remarkably advanced for its time, and despite setbacks and several crashes, the vehicle demonstrated a range in excess of 6,000 km with a thermonuclear (hydrogen) bomb-sized payload at speeds greater than Mach 3. The Burya had a two-stage design - the daring concept for an intercontinental missile was the second stage, which was powered by a ramjet engine at its operational speed of Mach 3. This varied from the original Trommsdorff concept of World War II in that no mother aircraft launch preceded the rocket boosted phase. The first stage was a ballistic-rocket-derived booster, which accelerated the Burya to altitude and the speed necessary to ignite its ramjet engine: a ramjet does not operate below subsonic speeds, and to use a hybrid jet-ramjet to broaden its operating speed would have been more complex.

Successful tests were achieved after official cancellation of the project, when it continued as a technology demonstration. It was a casualty, like the USAF Navaho, of the greater simplicity and relative invulnerability to interception of intercontinental ballistic missiles. The Burya was an early precursor to the Zvezda and Buran projects.

The guidance system was realized using an inertial system and also a star tracking system. The star tracking system located its position relative to the brightest stars through windows located on the top of stage 2. The star tracking system was more accurate for a long range flight compared to the inertial systems available at that time, even if more complex.

Specifications

General characteristics
Function: Nuclear cruise missile
Launch mass: 96,000 kg
Total length: 19.9 m
Launch platform: Launch pad
First flight test: 1 July 1957
Last flight test: 16 December 1960
Number of successful launches: 14
Number of failed launches: 3
Status: Canceled

Launch vehicle (stage 1)
Function: Multi-purpose launch vehicle
Engine: 2× Burya booster with S2.1150 engine
Length: 18.9 m
Diameter: 1.45 m
Thrust: 68.61 t
Oxidizer: Nitric acid
Combustible: Amine

Cruise missile (stage 2)
Engine: 1× RD-012U ramjet
Cruise Speed : Mach 3.1-3.3
Maximal speed in test: Mach 3.4-3.5 (3 700 km/h)
Range: 8000 - 8,500 km
Maximal range in test: 6,500 km 
Flight altitude: 18–25,5  km
Warhead: thermonuclear, 2190 kg
Length: 18.0 m
Diameter: 2.20 m
Wing span: 7.75 m
Wing area: 60 m²

References

Cruise missiles of the Cold War
Nuclear cruise missiles of the Soviet Union
Lavochkin
Ramjet engines
Abandoned military projects of the Soviet Union